This is a list of the etymology of street names in the London district of Waterloo. The area has no formally defined boundaries – those utilised here are the river Thames to the north and west, Blackfriars Road to the east, and Westminster Bridge Road to the south.
 
 Addington Street
 Alaska Street
 Aquinas Street
 Barge House Street and Old Barge House Alley – as this was the former location of the royal barges during Tudor times and after
 Baron's Place – after the Baron family, local landowners in the 18th century
 Baylis Road – after Lilian Baylis, manager of the Old Vic in the early 20th century
 Belvedere Road – after Belvedere House and gardens, opened in 1718 on the site of what is now the Royal Festival Hall
 Blackfriars Road – named after Blackfriars Bridge in 1769/70; it was formerly Great Surrey Street, reflecting the traditional county it is in
 Boundary Row
 Brad Street
 Broadwall – after a former earthen dyke located here, marking the western boundary of the parish of Paris Gardens/Christchurch
 Burdett Street
 Burrows Mews – after the nearby Burrows Buildings, built 1770
 Chaplin Close
 Charlie Chaplin Walk – after Charlie Chaplin, famous 20th century comedian and actor, who was born in South London
 Chicheley Street – after Henry Chichele, 15th century archbishop, by connection with the nearby Lambeth Palace
 Coin Street – unknown, thought possibly after a former mint located here in the time of Henry VIII; it was formerly Prince's Street until 1893, after the Prince Regent (later George IV)
 Colombo Street – after Alexander Colombo, 19th century bailiff of the local manor of Paris Gardens
 Concert Hall Approach – as it leads to the Royal Festival Hall, built 1951
 Cons Street – after Emma Cons, manager of the Old Vic in the 1880s
 Cooper Close
 Coral Street
 Cornwall Road – as it formed part of the manor of Kennington, which belonged to the Duchy of Cornwall; it was Green Lane prior to 1815
 Cottesloe Mews
 Cranfield Row
 The Cut – as when built it cut through what was then open country/marsh
 Dibdin Row
 Dodson Street
 Doon Street
 Duchy Place and Duchy Street – as it formed part of the manor of Kennington, which belonged to the Duchy of Cornwall
 Emery Street – after the nearby Wellington Mills, which manufactured emery paper in the 19th century; prior to 1893 it was Short Street
 Exton Street
 Forum Magna Square
 Frazier Street
 Gabriel's Wharf
 Gerridge Street
 Granby Place
 Gray Street
 Greenham Close
 Greet Street
 Grindal Street – for Edmund Grindal, 16th century archbishop, by association with the nearby Lambeth Palace
 Hatfields – as fur hats were formerly made here
 Holmes Terrace
 Isabella Street
 Joan Street
 Johanna Street – possibly after local resident and subscriber to the Old Vic Johanna Serres
 Jurston Court
 Launcelot Street – after Launcelot Holland, local developer in the 1820s
 Leake Court and Leake Street – after John Leake, founder of a local hospital in 1767
 Lower Marsh – as this land was formerly a marsh prior to the 19th century
 Lower Road 
 Marigold Alley – after a former 18th century inn here called the Marygold, possibly named for the flower, symbol of Mary I
 Mepham Street – after a 14th-century Archbishop of Canterbury Simon Mepeham
 Meymott Street – after the Meymott family, several of whom were stewards of Paris Gardens manor in the 19th century
 Miller Walk
 Mitre Road
 Morley Street – after Samuel Morley, benefactor of the Old Vic in the 1880s
 Murphy Street 
 Paris Garden – the name of the former manor here; it may derive from ‘parish’ or the Old French ‘pareil’ (enclosure), or possibly after 15th century local family the de Parys
 Pear Place
 Pearman Street
 Pontypool Place
 The Queen's Walk – named in 1977 to commemorate the Silver Jubilee of Queen Elizabeth II 
 Rennie Street – after John Rennie the Elder, prominent 18th century engineer, who designed Waterloo Bridge and Southwark Bridge
 Roupell Street – after local 19th century property owner John Roupell
 St George's Circus – as this area was formerly called St George's Fields, after St George the Martyr, Southwark church; the circus opened in 1770
 Sandell Street – after one Mr Sandell, who owned warehouses here in the 1860s
 Secker Street – after Thomas Secker, Archbishop of Canterbury 1758–68, by connection with the nearby Lambeth Palace
 Short Street – after local early 19th century carpenter Samuel Short
 South Bank – descriptive, as it is the south bank of the Thames 
 Spur Road
 Stamford Street – after Stamford, Lincolnshire, hometown of John Marshall, local benefactor and churchman
 Station Approach Road – as it leads to Waterloo station 
 Sutton Walk
 Tanswell Street
 Tenison Way – after Thomas Tenison, Archbishop of Canterbury 1695–1715, by connection with the nearby Lambeth Palace
 Theed Street
 Tress Place
 Ufford Street
 Upper Ground – as this was formerly a raise earth ditch between the river and Surrey marshland; formerly Upper Ground Street
 Valentine Place
 Waterloo Bridge and Waterloo Road – the road was built in 1817 shortly after the British victory over Napoleon at the Battle of Waterloo
 Webber Street
 Westminster Bridge Road – as it leads to Westminster Bridge
 West Road
 Whittlesey Street
 Windmill Walk – after the windmills formerly located here when it was countryside; formerly Windmill Street
 Wootton Street
 York Road

References
Citations

Sources

Streets in the London Borough of Lambeth
Lists of United Kingdom placename etymology
History of the London Borough of Lambeth
Waterloo
England geography-related lists